Gonga Chilonir Pakhi (English: Feathers of the tern) is an Assamese language film by Padum Barua released in 1976. The film is based on the novel of the same title authored by Lakshmi Nandan Bora.

Plot summary
The film depicts the story of Basanti, a young village woman, pitted against two men in a small town environment of the sixties. After the death of her husband Mathura, she starts dreaming of a new life with her former lover Dhananjay. He fails to respond forcing Basanti into the lonely life within a widow's bondage.

Characters
Basanti, a young village woman
Mathura, Basanti's husband
Dhananjay, Basanti's former lover
Bhogram, Basanti's elder brother
Taru, Basanti's elder sister-in-law
Monbori, the house cleaner

See also
Jollywood

References

Rupaliparda 
IFFI 2009 : 75 YEARS OF ASSAMESE CINEMA
Padam Barua:The vanguard of new ‘Assamese’ cinema

External links
 'Gonga Chilonir Pakhi' in youtube

1976 films
Films set in Assam
1970s Assamese-language films